Little Madawaska River may refer to:

 Little Madawaska River (Maine)
 Little Madawaska River (Ontario)

See also 
 Madawaska River (disambiguation)